The following is a list of notable software for creating, modifying and deploying Adobe Flash and Adobe Shockwave format.

Playback
 Adobe Flash Player
 Adobe Flash Lite
 Adobe AIR
 Gameswf
 Gnash
 Lightspark
 Ruffle
 Shumway
 Scaleform GFx
 Swfdec

Authoring
"Authoring" in computing, is the act of creating a document, especially a multimedia document, hypertext or hypermedia.
 Adobe Flash Professional
 Adobe Flash Builder
 Adobe Flash Catalyst 
 Adobe Flash Media Live Encoder
 Ajax Animator
 FlashDevelop
 Haxe
 Powerflasher FDT
 MTASC
 OpenFL
 OpenLaszlo
 Print2Flash
 Qflash
 SWFTools
 swfmill
 SWiSH Max
 Stencyl

Compilers 
 Adobe Flash Professional
 Apache Flex
 CrossBridge
 Google Swiffy
 SWFTools
 swfmill

Debuggers and profilers
 Adobe Scout
 FlashFirebug

Libraries 
 Ming
 SWFAddress
 SWFObject
 SWFFit
 Papervision3D
 Stage3D
 Away3D
 Flare3D
 Starling

Server software 
Adobe Flash Media Server

See also
 Flash for Linux

References

External links
 ScriptSWF at SourceForge
 OSFlash

Adobe Flash
Adobe Flash software